Total Magique is the second album of Montreal group We Are Wolves. It was released in 2007. "Fight and Kiss" is featured on the video game Need for Speed: Pro Street, while "Psychic Kids" is featured on the video game Midnight Club: Los Angeles.

Track listing 
 "Fight and Kiss" – 3:04
 "Magique" – 2:25
 "Some Words" – 2:45
 "Coconut Night" – 3:51
 "I Wrote Your Name On My Kite" – 3:12
 "Vietnam" – 3:20
 "Walk Away Walk" – 3:24
 "So Nice, So Cold" – 2:48
 "Psychic Kids" – 4:17
 "Teenage Bats & Anthropology" – 3:55
 "Vamos A La Playa" – 4:16
 "The Piper" – 1:02
 "Total Solide" – 4:40

References 

2007 albums
We Are Wolves albums
Bravo Musique albums